Insulin-like growth factor-binding protein 5 (IBF-5) is a protein that in humans is encoded by the IGFBP5 gene.  An IGFBP5 gene was recently identified as being important for adaptation to varying water salinity in fish.

References

Further reading